Two ships of the Royal Netherlands Navy have been named HNLMS Abraham Crijnssen, after the 17th century naval commander Abraham Crijnssen:

, a Jan van Amstel-class minesweeper that entered service in 1937, operated by the Royal Australian Navy between 1942 and 1943, decommissioned in 1960, and preserved as a museum ship
, a  that entered service in 1983, left service in 1997, and was sold to the United Arab Emirates

Royal Netherlands Navy ship names